The Réunion olive white-eye (Zosterops olivaceus) is a species of bird in the family Zosteropidae. It is found on Réunion. Its natural habitats are boreal forests and subtropical or tropical high-altitude grassland.

In 1760 the French zoologist Mathurin Jacques Brisson included a description of the Reunion olive white-eye in his Ornithologie based on a specimen that had been brought to Paris from Île Bourbon (now Réunion), but which Brisson mistakenly believed had been collected in Madagascar. He used the French name Le grimpereau olive de Madagascar and the Latin Certhia Madagascariensis Olivaceus. Although Brisson coined Latin names, these do not conform to the binomial system and are not recognised by the International Commission on Zoological Nomenclature. When in 1766 the Swedish naturalist Carl Linnaeus updated his Systema Naturae for the twelfth edition, he added 240 species that had been previously described by Brisson. One of these was the Reunion olive white-eye. Linnaeus included a brief description, coined the binomial name Certhia olivacea and cited Brisson's work. He followed Brisson and gave the type location as Madagascar instead of Réunion. This species is now placed in the genus Zosterops that was introduced by the naturalists Nicholas Vigors and Thomas Horsfield in 1827. There are no recognised subspecies.

References

Birds described in 1766
Taxa named by Carl Linnaeus
Birds of Réunion
Zosterops
Taxonomy articles created by Polbot